Mehrower Allee is a railway station in the Marzahn-Hellersdorf district of Berlin. It is served by the S-Bahn line .

References

Mehrower Allee
Buildings and structures in Marzahn-Hellersdorf
Railway stations in Germany opened in 1980
1980 establishments in East Germany